Muhammad Abbas Khan Abbasi (born 24 March 1924 – died 14 March 1988) also known as Alhaj Mohammad Abbas Khan Abbasi, was the Nawab and later Amir of the Bahawalpur State. He was also a Brigadier in the Pakistani Army, Governor of Punjab and member of the Bahawalpur royal family.

He became Nawab on the death of his father General Nawab Sir Sadiq Muhammad Khan V Abbasi on 24 May 1966.

As head of the Royal House of Bahawalpur, he was recognized as "Ameer of Bahawalpur State" by the then Government of Pakistan led by Field Marshal Ayub Khan.

Early life
He was born to General Nawab Sir Sadiq Muhammad Khan V Abbasi on 24 March 1924. He has several siblings most notably S.M. Abbasi. He received his education from Aitchison College in Lahore.

Career
He was deputy to the Prime Minister/President of the States Army.

References 

1924 births
1988 deaths
Bahawalpur royal family
Governors of Punjab, Pakistan
Pakistan People's Party politicians
Pakistan Army officers
Pakistani Muslims
Aitchison College alumni
Pakistan Army personnel
Pakistan Military Academy alumni